Luiz Gustavo Trainini (born January 14, 1978 in Canoas) is an athlete from Brazil, who competes in archery.

2008 Summer Olympics
At the 2008 Summer Olympics in Beijing Trainini finished his ranking round with a total of 610 points, which gave him the 61st seed for the final competition bracket in which he faced Park Kyung-Mo in the first round. Park won the match by 116-99 and Trainini was eliminated. Park would go on to win the silver medal in the tournament.

References

1978 births
Living people
Brazilian male archers
Archers at the 2008 Summer Olympics
Archers at the 2011 Pan American Games
Olympic archers of Brazil
Sportspeople from Rio Grande do Sul
People from Canoas
Pan American Games competitors for Brazil
21st-century Brazilian people